Rajah Menuri Venkata Gurusaidutt or R. M. V. Gurusaidutt or Gurusai Dutt born (on 1 March 1990) to RMV Bharadwaj and RM Anjana is a badminton player from India. He trains at the Hyderabad's Gopichand Badminton Academy. He won the gold medal at the 2008 Commonwealth Youth Games and the bronze medal at the 2014 Commonwealth Games in Glasgow.

He competed at the 2014 Asian Games.

Career

Early career 
Gurusai Dutt took up badminton as a sport after watching Pullela Gopichand, the 2001 All England champion, play at a local stadium. In 2005, he won the sub-junior national doubles title and also qualified for the sub-junior ABC Championship. This, according to him, spurred him to focus entirely on the sport. He started his training with Gopichand.

In the international circuit, Gurusai Dutt first appeared in the boys doubles category at the 2006 World Junior Championships. The pair of Gurusai Dutt and K. Tarun progressed only until the second round. The Hindu praised the enthusiastic effort and fighting quality of the pair's game play. He represented India in the team event category, but failed to win his singles match against a Thailand opponent. Gurusai Dutt won the 2007 Andhra Pradesh Senior Badminton Championships after defeating the top seed – his first title. He played a vastly superior and controlled game and he looked the better player.

Foray into international circuit 
Gurusai Dutt won the bronze medal at the 2008 BWF World Junior Championships that was held in Pune. While he was India's National Junior Champion, Gurusai Dutt won the 2008 Dutch Junior International that was held in Haarlem. He became the first Indian to win this title. This win was seen as a good sign for India's chances at the 2008 Commonwealth Youth Games.

Carrying his form into the upcoming tournaments, Gurusai Dutt won the singles title at the Commonwealth Youth Games and Bahrain International Challenge badminton championship by the end of 2008. In 2009, he reached the quarterfinals of the 2009 Denmark Super Series. At the 2010 Yonex Sunrise India Open Badminton Championships, Gurusai Dutt created an upset in the quarterfinal by defeating former All England Champion, Muhammad Hafiz Hashim. Both Hashim and the media reports praised him for his game play. In the same year, Gurusai Dutt represented India at the South Asian Games. He not only won the silver medal in the singles event but also the gold medal in the team event category.

Retirement 
Gurusai Dutt announced his retirement from professional badminton through social media on 6 June 2022.

Achievements

Commonwealth Games 
Men's singles

South Asian Games 
Men's singles

BWF World Junior Championships 
Boys' singles

Commonwealth Youth Games 
Boys' singles

BWF Grand Prix 
The BWF Grand Prix has two levels, the BWF Grand Prix and Grand Prix Gold. It is a series of badminton tournaments sanctioned by the Badminton World Federation (BWF) since 2007.

Men's singles

  BWF Grand Prix Gold tournament
  BWF Grand Prix tournament

BWF International Challenge/Series 
Men's singles

  BWF International Challenge tournament
  BWF International Series tournament
  BWF Future Series tournament

References

External links 
 Gurusai Dutt at Olympic Gold Quest
 Profile at the Badminton Association of India

Living people
1990 births
Sportspeople from Bheemavaram
Racket sportspeople from Hyderabad, India
Indian male badminton players
Badminton players at the 2010 Asian Games
Badminton players at the 2014 Asian Games
Asian Games competitors for India
Badminton players at the 2014 Commonwealth Games
Commonwealth Games bronze medallists for India
Commonwealth Games medallists in badminton
South Asian Games gold medalists for India
South Asian Games silver medalists for India
South Asian Games medalists in badminton
Medallists at the 2014 Commonwealth Games